The 2017–18 NLEX Road Warriors season was the fourth season of the franchise in the Philippine Basketball Association (PBA).

Key dates

2017
October 29: The 2017 PBA draft took place in Midtown Atrium, Robinson Place Manila.

Draft picks

Roster

Philippine Cup

Eliminations

Standings

Game log

|- style="background:#bfb;"
| 1
| December 20
| Kia
| W 119–115
| Kiefer Ravena (18)
| Rabeh Al-Hussaini (8)
| Kiefer Ravena (12)
| Filoil Flying V Centre
| 1–0
|- style="background:#bfb;"
| 2
| December 25
| GlobalPort
| W 115–104
| Kiefer Ravena (20)
| J. R. Quiñahan (9)
| Larry Fonacier (7)
| Philippine Arena22,531
| 2–0

|- style="background:#fcc;"
| 3
| January 7
| Phoenix
| L 95–102
| Larry Fonacier (22)
| Quiñahan, Taulava (9)
| Kiefer Ravena (7)
| Smart Araneta Coliseum9,000
| 2–1
|- style="background:#fcc;"
| 4
| January 14
| Magnolia
| L 94–105
| Kiefer Ravena (31)
| J. R. Quiñahan (10)
| Kiefer Ravena (5)
| Smart Araneta Coliseum
| 2–2
|- style="background:#fcc;"
| 5
| January 19
| San Miguel
| L 98–109
| Kiefer Ravena (15)
| Michael Miranda (11)
| Kiefer Ravena (6)
| Cuneta Astrodome
| 2–3
|- style="background:#fcc;"
| 6
| January 26
| Rain or Shine
| L 86–97
| J. R. Quiñahan (22)
| Alex Mallari (9)
| six players (3)
| Smart Araneta Coliseum
| 2–4

|- style="background:#bfb;"
| 7
| February 3
| Barangay Ginebra
| W 81–78 
| Larry Fonacier (17)
| Raul Soyud (10)
| Kiefer Ravena (5)
| Cuneta Astrodome
| 3–4
|- style="background:#bfb;"
| 8
| February 9
| Meralco
| W 87–85
| Kiefer Ravena (21)
| Alex Mallari (10)
| Kiefer Ravena (4)
| Cuneta Astrodome
| 4–4
|- style="background:#bfb;"
| 9
| February 11
| Alaska
| W 96–89
| three players (15)
| Alas, Baguio (8)
| Kiefer Ravena (10)
| Smart Araneta Coliseum
| 5–4
|- style="background:#bfb;"
| 10
| February 18
| Blackwater
| W 93–90
| Kevin Alas (25)
| Michael Miranda (9)
| Kevin Alas (5)
| Philippine Arena
| 6–4
|- style="background:#fcc;"
| 11
| February 28
| TNT
| L 75–101
| J. R. Quiñahan (20)
| Raul Soyud (11)
| Cyrus Baguio (5)
| Mall of Asia Arena
| 6–5

Playoffs

Bracket

Game log

|- style="background:#bfb;"
| 1
| March 5
| Alaska
| W 105–99
| Kiefer Ravena (25)
| J. R. Quiñahan (10)
| Kiefer Ravena (8)
| Mall of Asia Arena
| 1–0
|- style="background:#bfb;"
| 2
| March 7
| Alaska
| W 87–83
| Kevin Alas (18)
| Kevin Alas (9)
| Kiefer Ravena (7)
| Smart Araneta Coliseum
| 2–0

|- style="background:#bfb;"
| 1
| March 10
| Magnolia
| W 88–87
| Cyrus Baguio (17)
| J. R. Quiñahan (9)
| J. R. Quiñahan (7)
| Smart Araneta Coliseum
| 1–0
|- style="background:#fcc;"
| 2
| March 12
| Magnolia
| L 84–99
| Mallari, Quiñahan (13)
| Raul Soyud (6)
| Kiefer Ravena (7)
| Mall of Asia Arena
| 1–1
|- style="background:#fcc;"
| 3
| March 14
| Magnolia
| L 99–106
| Kiefer Ravena (20)
| Kevin Alas (9)
| Quiñahan, Ravena (5)
| Smart Araneta Coliseum
| 1–2
|- style="background:#bfb;"
| 4
| March 16
| Magnolia
| W 91–79
| Kiefer Ravena (20)
| Alas, Miranda (6)
| Alas, Ravena (5)
| Mall of Asia Arena
| 2–2
|- style="background:#fcc;"
| 5
| March 18
| Magnolia
| L 78–87
| Kiefer Ravena (21)
| Mallari, Soyud (9)
| Cyrus Baguio (7)
| Ynares Center
| 2–3
|- style="background:#fcc;"
| 6
| March 20
| Magnolia
| L 89–96
| Michael Miranda (20)
| Michael Miranda (8)
| Cyrus Baguio (6)
| Smart Araneta Coliseum
| 2–4

Commissioner's Cup

Eliminations

Standings

Game log

|- style="background:#fcc;"
| 1
| April 28
| Columbian
| L 103–123
| Adrian Forbes (26)
| Adrian Forbes (17)
| Larry Fonacier (6)
| Ynares Center
| 0–1

|- style="background:#fcc;"
| 2
| May 2
| Rain or Shine
| L 97–98
| Arnett Moultrie (24)
| Arnett Moultrie (17)
| Kiefer Ravena (8)
| Ynares Center
| 0–2
|- style="background:#fcc;"
| 3
| May 4
| Meralco
| L 90–106
| Arnett Moultrie (25)
| Arnett Moultrie (17)
| Kiefer Ravena (10)
| Smart Araneta Coliseum
| 0–3
|- style="background:#bfb;"
| 4
| May 11
| Phoenix
| W 120–115 (OT)
| Arnett Moultrie (37)
| Arnett Moultrie (17)
| Larry Fonacier (9)
| Alonte Sports Arena
| 1–3
|- style="background:#fcc;"
| 5
| May 16
| GlobalPort
| L 94–116
| Kiefer Ravena (24)
| Moultrie , Quiñahan (10)
| J. R. Quiñahan (7)
| Smart Araneta Coliseum
| 1–4
|- align="center"
|colspan="9" bgcolor="#bbcaff"|All-Star Break
|- style="background:#bfb;"
| 6
| May 30
| Blackwater
| W 93–89
| Arnett Moultrie (26)
| Arnett Moultrie (16)
| Juami Tiongson (10)
| Smart Araneta Coliseum
| 2–4

|- style="background:#fcc;"
| 7
| June 3
| TNT
| L 106–117
| Arnett Moultrie (31)
| Arnett Moultrie (14)
| Alex Mallari (6)
| Mall of Asia Arena
| 2–5
|- style="background:#fcc;"
| 8
| June 9
| Barangay Ginebra
| L 85–93
| Arnett Moultrie (30)
| Arnett Moultrie (19)
| Alex Mallari (4)
| Ibalong Centrum for Recreation
| 2–6
|- style="background:#fcc;"
| 9
| June 15
| Alaska
| L 111–120
| Arnett Moultrie (34)
| Arnett Moultrie (8)
| Mallari, Tiongson (4)
| Mall of Asia Arena
| 2–7
|- style="background:#fcc;"
| 10
| June 23
| San Miguel
| L 114–125
| Arnett Moultrie (43)
| Arnett Moultrie (14)
| Jonathan Uyloan (11)
| Calasiao Sports Complex
| 2–8

|- style="background:#fcc;"
| 11
| June 3
| Magnolia
| L 89–116
| Olu Ashaolu (31)
| Olu Ashaolu (12)
| Cyrus Baguio (5)
| Mall of Asia Arena
| 2–9

Governors' Cup

Eliminations

Standings

Game log

|- style="background:#bfb;"
| 1
| August 17
| TNT
| W 103–90
| Olu Ashaolu (33)
| Olu Ashaolu (23)
| J. R. Quiñahan (6)
| Ynares Center
| 1–0
|- style="background:#bfb;"
| 2
| August 19
| NorthPort
| W 123–107
| Olu Ashaolu (27)
| Olu Ashaolu (13)
| Alex Mallari (5)
| Ynares Center
| 2–0
|- style="background:#fcc;"
| 3
| August 22
| Magnolia
| L 72–102
| Olu Ashaolu (21)
| Olu Ashaolu (9)
| Ashaolu, Fonacier (3)
| Smart Araneta Coliseum
| 2–1
|- style="background:#bfb;"
| 4
| August 29
| Columbian
| W 116–104
| Aaron Fuller (35)
| Aaron Fuller (21)
| Aaron Fuller (7)
| Smart Araneta Coliseum
| 3–1

|- style="background:#fcc;"
| 5
| September 1
| San Miguel
| L 112–125
| Aaron Fuller (36)
| Aaron Fuller (16)
| Mark Tallo (9)
| Smart Araneta Coliseum
| 3–2
|- style="background:#bfb;"
| 6
| September 26
| Blackwater
| W 124–106
| Fonacier, Fuller (24)
| Aaron Fuller (20)
| Fonacier, Tallo (5)
| Smart Araneta Coliseum
| 4–2

|- style="background:#fcc;"
| 7
| October 5
| Barangay Ginebra
| L 92–106
| Larry Fonacier (21)
| Aaron Fuller (19)
| Aaron Fuller (4)
| Smart Araneta Coliseum
| 4–3
|- style="background:#fcc;"
| 8
| October 10
| Phoenix
| L 97–123
| Aaron Fuller (38)
| Aaron Fuller (14)
| Monfort, Tallo (5)
| Cuneta Astrodome
| 4–4
|- style="background:#fcc;"
| 9
| October 14
| Meralco
| L 105–108
| Aaron Fuller (31)
| Aaron Fuller (13)
| Aaron Fuller (6)
| Smart Araneta Coliseum
| 4–5
|- style="background:#bfb;"
| 10
| October 26
| Alaska
| W 116–110 (OT)
| Aaron Fuller (42)
| Aaron Fuller (22)
| Philip Paniamogan (5)
| Ynares Center
| 5–5

|- style="background:#fcc;"
| 11
| November 3
| Rain or Shine
| L 101–107
| Aaron Fuller (29)
| Aaron Fuller (12)
| Aaron Fuller (7)
| Smart Araneta Coliseum
| 5–6

Playoffs

Bracket

Game log

|- style="background:#fcc;"
| 1
| November 6
| Barangay Ginebra
| L 75–111
| Aaron Fuller (25)
| Aaron Fuller (12)
| Aaron Fuller (4)
| Smart Araneta Coliseum
| 0–1

Transactions

Trades

Preseason

Recruited imports

Awards

References

NLEX Road Warriors seasons
NLEX